Vincly is a commune in the Pas-de-Calais department in the Hauts-de-France region of France.

Geography
Vincly is located 21 miles (33 km) northeast of Montreuil-sur-Mer on the D104 road.

Population

Places of interest
 The church of St.Thomas of Canterbury, dating from the sixteenth century.

See also
Communes of the Pas-de-Calais department

References

Communes of Pas-de-Calais